The 2008–09 Irish League Cup (known as the Co-operative Insurance Cup for sponsorship reasons) was the 23rd edition of Northern Ireland's secondary football knock-out cup competition. The tournament started on 26 August 2008 with the qualifying round and ended on 28 February 2009 with the Final.

Linfield were the defending champions after their ninth League Cup win last season; a 3–2 victory over Crusaders in the previous final. This season Linfield went out at the quarter-final stage to eventual winners Portadown, who defeated Newry City 1–0 in the final. This was Portadown's second League Cup win, and first one since 1995–96. This was also only the second time in twelve years that the cup had not been won by one of Belfast's Big Two.

The competition was expanded this season and the format was also changed due to a re-structuring of the league system. 29 clubs were now eligible to take part in the competition; the 12 members of the IFA Premiership and the 17 members of the IFA Championship, with the Premiership clubs entering in the third round. The group stage format used in previous seasons was dropped in favour of home and away two-legged aggregate score ties with an away goals rule.

Qualifying round
The qualifying round was held in order to reduce the number of teams competing in the First Round to 16. The match was played on 26 August 2008.

|}

First round
In this round entered the winners from the previous round, Glebe Rangers, as well as the remaining 15 teams from the IFA Championship. The first legs were played on 29 and 30 August 2008. The second legs were played on 2, 3 and 9 September 2008.

|}

Second round
In this round entered the eight winners from the previous round. The first legs were played on 20 September 2008. The second legs were played on 23, 24 September and 1 October 2008.

|}

Third round
In this round entered the four winners from the previous round, together with the 12 members of the IFA Premiership. The first legs were played on 21, 22, 28 and 29 October 2008. The second legs were played on 4, 5, 11 and 12 November 2008.

|}

Quarter-finals
The first legs were played on 2 and 3 December 2008. The second legs were played on 16 and 17 December 2008.

|}

Semi-finals

Final

References

Lea
Irish League Cup seasons
Irish League Cup